While the Children Sleep (also known as The Sitter) is a 2007 American made-for-television horror film directed by Russell Mulcahy and starring Gail O'Grady, William R. Moses, Mariana Klaveno, Tristan Lake Leabu, Madison Davenport, and Stacy Haiduk. Released on the Lifetime Movie Network, its plot concerns a couple who hires a live-in nanny who inserts herself increasingly into the family routine. Then friends of the family begin to have mysterious accidents, as the nanny conspires to replace the mother through murder.

The film received generally negative reviews, with many critics saying the film was derivative of other 90’s femme fatale psychological thrillers, with many especially comparing it to the similar film The Hand That Rocks the Cradle (1992). Despite this, Mariana Klaveno’s performance as psychopath Abby received praise.

Plot
A couple, Carter and Meghan, decide that they should hire a live-in sitter so that they can both work and support their two children, Max and Casey. Abby Reed answers their advertisement and they move her in immediately. After some initial rough spots with the kids, the family warms to Abby. Abby seems obsessed with Carter, and when she helps organize a company party for a big success — that is rained out — she's in tears and distraught over the failed party. Carter's friend Tate tries to take advantage of Abby in her upset state, and then Tate is discovered dead in a car accident. Neighbor Mel is then suspicious of Abby, and is soon found dead as well, electrocuted in her bath. Then, Meghan's friend Shawna, now suspecting Abby as well, threatens disclosure as the final moments of Abby's plan to replace Meghan unfold. As backstory, we find that Abby had been rescued from her abusive mother by family lawyer Carter many years before, where Abby's obsession originates with the family and desire to replace Meghan as his wife.

Cast
Mariana Klaveno as Abigail "Abby" Reed/Linda Reynolds
Dominique Grund as young Abby/Linda
Gail O'Grady as Meghan Eastman
William R. Moses as Carter Eastman
Tristan Lake Leabu as Maxwell "Max" Eastman
Madison Davenport as Casey Eastman
Stacy Haiduk as Shawna Pierson
Joanne Baron as Melissa "Mel" Olson
Alan Blumenfeld as Del Olson
Thomas Curtis as Thomas "Tom" Olson
Jon Lindstrom as Tate Walker
Monique Daniels as Laura Berry
Jill Jaress as Elizabeth Reynolds
Jordan Moser as Chris

Reception
The film's plot was compared by reviewers to the 1992 film The Hand That Rocks the Cradle and the 2001 film The Glass House, as well as others.

DVD release
The film was released on DVD on June 17, 2008 under the name The Sitter.

References

External links

2000s English-language films
Films directed by Russell Mulcahy
Lifetime (TV network) films
American psychological thriller films
2007 psychological thriller films
2007 television films
2007 films
Films scored by Elia Cmíral
2000s American films